USS Hydrographer may refer to the following ships of the United States Navy:

, was a wooden steam launch built in 1901 and came under US Navy jurisdiction in 1917. She continued her surveying duties in the Gulf of Mexico and was returned to the Coast and Geodetic Survey 1 April 1919
, was a survey ship acquired by the US Navy in April 1942 and decommissioned 1 July 1946

United States Navy ship names